Joseph Campbell (15 July 1879 – 6 June 1944) was an Irish poet and lyricist. He wrote under the Gaelic form of his name Seosamh Mac Cathmhaoil (also Seosamh MacCathmhaoil) Campbell being a common anglicization of the old Irish name MacCathmhaoil. He is now remembered best for words he supplied to traditional airs, such as My Lagan Love and Gartan Mother's Lullaby; his verse was also set to music by Arnold Bax and Ivor Gurney.

Life
He was born in Belfast, into a Catholic and Irish nationalist family from County Down. He was educated at St Malachy's College, Belfast. After working for his father he taught for a while. He travelled to Dublin in 1902, meeting leading nationalist figures. His literary activities began with songs, as a collector in Antrim and working with the composer Herbert Hughes. He was then a founder of the Ulster Literary Theatre in 1904. He contributed a play, The Little Cowherd of Slainge, and several articles to its journal Uladh edited by Bulmer Hobson.  The Little Cowherd of Slainge was performed by the ULT at the Clarence Place Hall in Belfast on 4 May 1905, along with Lewis Purcell's The Enthusiast.

He moved to Dublin in 1905, failed to find work and the following year (1906) he moved to London where he was involved in Irish literary activities while working as a teacher. He married in 1910 Nancy Maude, and they moved shortly to Dublin, and then County Wicklow. His play Judgement was performed at the Abbey Theatre in April 1912.

He took part as a supporter in the Easter Rising of 1916, doing rescue work. The following year he published a translation from Irish of the short stories of Patrick Pearse, one of the leaders of the Rising.

He became a Sinn Féin Councillor in Wicklow in 1921. Later in the Irish Civil War he was on the Republican side, and was interned in 1922/3. His marriage broke up, and he emigrated to the United States in 1925. There he lived in New York City. He lectured at Fordham University, and worked in academic Irish studies, founding the University's School of Irish Studies in 1928, which lasted four years.
He  was the editor of The Irish Review, a short lived  (April, May and July 1934)   "magazine of Irish expression". Business  manager was George G. Lennon, former Officer Commanding of the Co. Waterford Flying Column during the Irish War of Independence. Managing editor was  Lennon's  brother in law, George H. Sherwood.  Campbell returned to Ireland in 1939, settling at Glencree, County Wicklow, and dying at Lacken Daragh, Enniskerry on 6 June 1944.

Works
Songs of Uladh (1904) with Seaghan Campbell
The Old Woman'   by Joseph CampbellThe Little Cowherd of Slainge (1904) playThe Garden of the Bees (1905) poemsThe Rush-Light (1906) poemsThe Man-Child (1907) poemsThe Gilly of Christ (1907) poemsThe Mountainy Singer (1909) poemsMearing Stones (1911) travel writingJudgment: A Play (1912)Irishry (1913) poemsEarth of Cualann (1917) poemsCollected Poems of Joseph Campbell (1963)As I was Among the Captives: Joseph Campbell's Prison Diary (2001), edited by Eiléan Ní ChuilleanáinI Will Go with My Father A-PloughingFour Irish Songs (n.d.) by Charlottr Milligan Fox, illustrations as Seaghan MacCathmhaiol.

See also

John Patrick Campbell, his brother
List of Irish writers

References

Norah Saunders, 1988. Joseph Campbell: Poet & Nationalist 1879-1944, a Critical Biography'',

External links
 
 

20th-century Irish poets
1879 births
1944 deaths
Writers from Belfast
People from County Antrim
People of the Irish Civil War (Anti-Treaty side)
Fordham University faculty
People educated at St Malachy's College
Irish expatriates in the United States
Translators from Irish
Irish–English translators